D'Arcy Browning is a Canadian actor born in Edmonton and raised in South Cooking Lake, Alberta in the early 2000s he portrayed Jesus Christ in the Canadian Badlands Passion Play, Drumheller. The CBC filmed the documentary The Cross and Bones following Browning and the cast, paleontology experts from the Tyrell Museum and the bikers of the valley for the clash of science and religion every summer for the past dozen years.  The film opened Hot Docs Canadian International Documentary Festival for the Toronto-based documentary film festival and travelled internationally.

Browning received his BTh, was with Fellowship of Christian Assemblies (FOCA) until he took a role on staff with Youth for Christ Calgary.  He studied at Wheaton Illinois and took gang training in Chicago.

Browning attended the World Championships of Performing Arts in 2009 in Hollywood, California and received 4 Gold Medals, 5 Silver Medals and 6 Bronze Medals for performances in competitions with international participants in the areas of acting, singing and modeling.

Perhaps the best part is yet to come.  Browning still maintains a ranch in Alberta while he works with organizations providing food for the needy across Nicaragua and hopefully Costa Rica in 2023. Jesus Christ is Lord!

World Championships of Performing Arts 2009 results
GOLD - Male Modeling Photo
GOLD - Male Acting Classical
GOLD - Male Vocal Country & Western

He has appeared before over a hundred thousand live on stage, Television, and International Films.  He also was coro 4 seasons with Calgary Opera.

References

Year of birth missing (living people)
Living people
Male actors from Edmonton
Canadian male film actors
Canadian male stage actors
People from Strathcona County